Particle is a 2012 Turkish drama film written and directed by Erdem Tepegöz. It was selected to compete in the main competition section of the 35th Moscow International Film Festival where it won the Golden George and Jale Arıkan won the Silver George for Best Actress.

Plot
Zeynep lost her job at weaving factory, and her family - mother and handicapped daughter have no money for live. Zeynep tries to find new job in Istanbul.

Cast
 Jale Arıkan as Zeynep
 Rüçhan Caliskur as Mother of Zeynep
 Özay Fecht as Seniha
 Remzi Pamukcu as Remzi
 Ergun Kuyucu as Kudret
 Dilay Demrok as Daughter of Zeynep
 Sencer Sagdiç as Chief
 Cemal Baykal as Mumtaz
 Mesude Turkmen as Ayse
 Suat Oktay Senocak as Doctor

References

External links
 

2012 films
2012 drama films
2012 directorial debut films
Turkish drama films
2010s Turkish-language films